Helena Andreevna Sangushko (1490 – 1561) was a princess from the Sangushko (Kamień Koszyrski branch) and Ostrogski princely families.

Daughter of Prince Andrei Alexandrovich Sangushko (d. 1534), and Princess Ksenia-Maria Ivanovna Ostrogska (b. 1458).

Biography

Parents
Prince Andrey Alexandrovich Sangushko (d. 1534) - Prince of Kashirsky, governor of Kremenets (1498-1502), Bratslav and Vinnitsa (1500-1501), headman of Vladimir (1508-1531), marshal of Volyn land (1522-1534). The second son of the prince Alexander Sangushkovich (d. after 1491), Prince of Kashirsky, headman of Vladimir and governor of Kremenets. He was buried in the Church of the Virgin of the Kiev-Pechersk Lavra. 

Princess Ksenia-Maria Ivanovna Ostrogska (born 1458) was the sister of the Grand Crown Hetman, Prince Konstantin Ostrogski. The family of the Ostrogski princes were descendants of the Turov-Pinsk princes - the descendants of the Grand Duke of Kiev Svyatopolk (Mikhail) Izyaslavich (November 8, 1050 - April 16, 1113) from the Rurik dynasty. It is known that the princes Ostrogski and Sangushko were trustees of the Kiev-Pechersk Lavra, where many of them were buried. So, the imperishable relics of the great-grandfather of Ksenia-Maria and Konstantin Ostrogski - Feodor Danilovich Ostrogski (1360-1446) rest in distant caves. Feodor Ostrogski took part with his own banner in the Battle of Grunwald in 1410, fought for the Hussites in the Czech Republic, and then took monastic vows in the Kiev Lavra.

Family and children
Princess Helena Andreevna Sangushko was married twice. 

 The first husband of the princess was Prince Peter Timofeevich Massalski.
 The second husband of the princess was Stanislav Skop (Skopov) - Royal Secretary, Skertsomon and Tendziagilski dergavtsa (tiun, ruler) (land in Samogitia, Taurage County) in 1527-1529. Stanislav Skop (Skopov) was the grandson of Skop (died before 1500) from the princely Dovsprung dynasty.

Hans (Johan) Skopovny (b. ~ 1525), the only son of Princess Helena Andreevna and Stanislav Skop (Skopov), was the tiun (ruler) of Samogitia (Land of Zhemaitiya) in 1567. The daughter of Hans - Anna Skopovna, together with her husband Boleslav Dubikowski (1580-1665, Ostoja CoA) were the Smolensk's Deputy Cup-bearers in the early to mid 1600s.

See also 
 Ostrogski family
 Sangushko family
 Hans Skopovny
 Clan Ostoja (Moscics)
 Dubikowski family with Ostoja CoA

Footnotes

Bibliography 
 Sanguszko (Sanguszkowicz) Andrzej Aleksandrowicz, książę z linii niesuchoieskiej (zm. 1534/5) / Polski Słownik Biograficzny. — Wrocław — Warszawa — Kraków — Gdańsk — Łódź: Zakład Narodowy Imienia Ossolińskich Wydawnictwo Polskiej Akademii Nauk, 1985.- Tom XXXIV/3. — Zeszyt 142. — S. 329—472  (польск.) S. 468—469  (польск.).
 Ros Kan. The Story of One Kin. Kiev 2022, 67 s.

1490 births
1561 deaths
Lithuanian noble families
Ruthenian noble families
Ruthenian nobility of the Polish–Lithuanian Commonwealth
Sanguszko family
Ostrogski family